Ferrel Seamount is a small seamount (underwater volcano) west of Baja California, at . Ferrel seamount has been mapped approximately 18% by the USGS, and has two summits. It is located in the Baja California seamounts region, and sits on the edge of the abyssal plain.

References

Seamounts of the Pacific Ocean